The 2013 Conference USA men's basketball tournament was held at the BOK Center in Tulsa, Oklahoma from March 13-16, 2013. Memphis was slated to host the 2013 edition but the conference moved it to Tulsa in order to keep Memphis from having home-court advantage during their final appearance in the tournament.

The 2013 tournament was the last to feature participation from Memphis, Houston, and SMU, as the three schools joined the American Athletic Conference on July 1, 2013.  The winner of the tournament will receive the conference's automatic bid to the 2013 NCAA tournament. UCF would also have been participating in the tournament for the last time, but was banned due to sanctions handed down by the NCAA in August 2012.

Bracket

All times listed are Central

References

Conference USA men's basketball tournament
Tournament
Conference USA men's basketball tournament
Conference USA men's basketball tournament